The Bengal Tenancy Act 1885 was an enactment of the Bengal government that defined the rights of zamindars lords and their tenants in response to a widespread peasant revolt. In "Pabna Revolts" or Pabna Agrarian Uprisings were actually mass meetings, strikes, and legal battles against exploitative zamindars that had started since 1870s.

Eighteenth century
The Permanent settlement of 1793 gave absolute rights to the zamindars, who were  hereditary landholders and ruled as such, but the rights of tenants were not defined. With time, in the nineteenth century, the land demand increased and the lords increased rents and land revenues. The Raiyots (tenants) refused to accept the zamindari rent increase beyond the customary rates.

This time period also saw a rise in the lesser-landed nobility (Chowdhurys and Taluqdars), whose existence did not fall under the Permanent Settlement laws. The Madhyasvatvas, as they were called (literally Subinfeudation), received their rights by purchase, and not by inheritance like the lords. The government tried to accommodate this class by enacting the Rent Act in 1859. But the issues remained.

Nineteenth century 
Uprisings such as that in Pabna caused great problems. The Rent Commission of the Bengal Legislative Council, therefore, enacted the third Act of 1885.

See also
 Permanent Settlement Regulations of 1793
 East Bengal State Acquisition and Tenancy Act of 1950
Asiatic Society of Bangladesh

References

External links
Act's full text at Archive.org

Bengal Presidency